Qatrani-ye Sofla Yek (also Romanized as Qaţrāni-ye Soflá Yek) is a village in Buzi Rural District, in the Central District of Shadegan County, Khuzestan Province, Iran. At the 2006 census, its population was 146, in 28 families.

References 

Populated places in Shadegan County